The 2014 season is Johor Darul Takzim F.C.' 2nd season in the Malaysia Super League after rebranding their name from Johor FC.

Squads

First Team Squad

Pre-season and friendlies

Malaysia Super League

JDT starts their Malaysia Super League campaign with 2-0 win against Perak. Amri Yahyah opens the score with a glance header from a corner in 39th minutes and Luciano Figueroa scores another one in the  88th minutes after a wonderful through pass from Safiq Rahim to put JDT their first win for this season.

Results
Fixtures and Results of the Malaysia Super League 2014 season.

Malaysia FA Cup

In 2014 Malaysia FA Cup Johor Darul Takzim F.C. getting the 'bye' for being a finalist in 2013 Malaysia FA Cup.JDT will faced T–Team F.C. or UiTM F.C. on 4 February 2014.

Results
Fixtures and Results of the 2014 Malaysia FA Cup.

Johor Darul Takzim F.C. gets a first round 'bye' for being a finalist in 2013 Malaysia FA Cup Final.

Malaysia Cup

Group stages

Results
Fixtures and Results of the 2014 Malaysia Cup.

Knockout stage

Bracket

Results

Goalscorers
Includes all competitive matches. The list is sorted by shirt number when total goals are equal.

Top Assists
Includes all competitive matches. The list is sorted by shirt number when total assists are equal.

Transfer

In

Out

References

Johor Darul Takzim
Johor Darul Ta'zim F.C.